

m
M-Predrol
M-Zole
M.V.C. 9+3
M.V.I.

ma

mab-mal
mabuprofen (INN)
mabuterol (INN)
Macrobid
Macrodantin
macrosalb (131 I) (INN)
macrosalb (99m tc) (INN)
Macrotec
maduramicin (INN)
mafenide (INN)
mafoprazine (INN)
mafosfamide (INN)
magaldrate (INN)
Magnacort
magnesium clofibrate (INN)
Magnevist
maitansine (INN)
Malarone
maletamer (INN)
maleylsulfathiazole (INN)
malotilate (INN)

man-mat
Mandol
mangafodipir (INN)
manidipine (INN)
manitimus (INN)
mannitol hexanitrate (INN)
mannomustine (INN)
mannosulfan (INN)
manozodil (INN)
Maolate
mapatumumab (INN)
mapinastine (INN)
mapracorat (INN)
maprotiline (INN)
maraciclatide (USAN)
marbofloxacin (INN)
Marcaine
Marezine
maridomycin (INN)
marijuana
Marinol (Solvay Pharmaceuticals)
mariptiline (INN)
marizomib (USAN, INN)
maropitant citrate (USAN)
maroxepin (INN)
Marplan
maslimomab (INN)
masoprocol (INN)
Masterone (Syntex)
Matulane (Sigma Tau Pharms)
matuzumab (INN)

mav-maz
mavacoxib (USAN)
Mavik
mavrilimumab (INN)
Maxair (3M) redirects to pirbuterol
Maxalt
Maxaquin
Maxibolin
Maxidex
Maxipime
Maxitrol
Maxolon
Maxzide
Mazanor
mazapertine (INN)
mazaticol (INN)
mazindol (INN)
mazipredone (INN)
mazokalim (INN)

md
MD
MDMA
MDP-Bracco